Leading and lagging current are phenomena that occur as a result of alternating current. In a circuit with alternating current, the value of voltage and current vary sinusoidally. In this type of circuit, the terms lead, lag, and in phase are used to describe current with reference to voltage. Current is in phase with voltage when there is no phase shift between the sinusoids describing their time varying behavior. This generally occurs when the load drawing the current is resistive.

In electric power flow, it is important to know how much current is leading or lagging because it creates the reactive power in the system, as opposed to the active (real) power. It can also play an important role in the operation of three phase electric power systems.

Angle notation
Angle notation can easily describe leading and lagging current:

 

In this equation, the value of theta is the important factor for leading and lagging current. As mentioned in the introduction above, leading or lagging current represents a time shift between the current and voltage sine curves, which is represented by the angle by which the curve is ahead or behind of where it would be initially. For example, if θ is zero, the curve will have amplitude zero at time zero. Using complex numbers is a way to simplify analyzing certain components in RLC circuits. For example, it is very easy to convert these between polar and rectangular coordinates. Starting from the polar notation,   can represent either the vector    or the rectangular notation    both of which have magnitudes of 1.

Lagging current

 

Therefore, current can quickly be identified as lagging if the angle  is positive. For example, if the voltage angle  is zero, current will be lagging if  is negative. This is often the case because voltage is taken as the reference.

In circuits with primarily inductive loads, current lags the voltage. This happens because in an inductive load, it is the induced electromotive force that causes the current to flow. Note that in the definition above, the current is produced by the voltage. The induced electromotive force is caused by a change in the magnetic flux linking the coils of an inductor.

Leading current

 

Therefore, current can quickly be identified as leading if the angle  is negative. For example, if the voltage angle  is zero, current will be leading if  is positive. This is often the case because voltage is taken as the reference.

In circuits with primarily capacitive loads, current leads the voltage. This is true because current must first flow to the two plates of the capacitor, where charge is stored. Only after charge accumulates at the plates of a capacitor is a voltage difference established. The behavior of the voltage is thus dependent on the behavior current and on how much charge accumulates. This is why the formal definition states that the current produces the voltage.

Visualizing leading and lagging current
A simple phasor diagram with a two dimensional Cartesian coordinate system and phasors can be used to visualize leading and lagging current at a fixed moment in time. In the real-complex coordinate system, one
period of a sine wave corresponds to a full circle in the complex plane. Since
the voltage and current have the same frequency, at any moment in time those
quantities can be easily represented by stationary points on the circle, while
the arrows from the center of circle to those points are called phasors. Since
the relative time difference between functions is constant, they also have a
constant angle difference between them, represented by the angle between points
on the circle.

Historical documents concerning leading and lagging currents
An early source of data is an article from the 1911 American Academy of Arts and Sciences by Arthur E. Kennelly.  Kennelly uses conventional methods in solving vector diagrams for oscillating circuits, which can also include alternating current circuits as well.

See also
 Electrical impedance
 Power factor
 Volt-ampere
 Volt-ampere reactive

Notes
References:

References
 Bowick, Chris, John Blyler, and Cheryl J. Ajluni. RF Circuit Design. 2nd ed. Amsterdam: Newnes/Elsevier, 2008. Print.
 Gaydecki, Patrick. Foundations of Digital Signal Processing: Theory, Algorithms and Hardware Design. 2nd ed. London: Institution of Electrical Engineers, 2004. Print
 Gilmore, Rowan, and Les Besser. Passive Circuits and Systems. Boston [u.a.: Artech House, 2003. Print.
 Hayt, W. H., and J. E. Kemmerly. Engineering Circuit Analysis. 2nd ed. New York: McGraw-Hill, 1971. Print.
 Kennelly, Arthur E. "Vector-Diagrams of Oscillating-Current Circuits." American Academy of Arts & Sciences 46.17 (1911): 373-421. Jstor. ITHAKA. Web. 1 May 2012. <https://www.jstor.org/stable/20022665>.
 "Lagging Current." TheFreeDictionary.com. Web. 1 May 2012. (http://encyclopedia2.thefreedictionary.com/lagging_current)
 "Leading Current." TheFreeDictionary.com. Web. 1 May 2012. (http://encyclopedia2.thefreedictionary.com/leading_current)
 Nilsson, James William; Riedel, Susan A. (2008). Electric circuits (8th ed.). Prentice Hall. p. 338. , Chapter 9, page 338
 Smith, Ralph J. Circuit Devices and Systems. 3rd ed. New York: John Wiley & Sons, 1976. Print.
 Glover, Duncan J. Power System Analysis and Design. 5th ed. Cengage Learning, 2014.
 Masters, G. Renewable and Efficient Electric Power Systems. 2nd ed. Wiley, 2004.

Electrical parameters
Electric power
Electrical engineering
AC power